Baiyangping railway station is a railway station located in Baiyangping Town, Jianshi County, Hubei Province, People's Republic of China, on the Yiwan Railway which operated by China Railway Corporation.

History
It's still under construction.

Railway stations in Hubei